Spartak Moscow was a Russian bandy club, which was founded in 1910 and changed names a number of times before it got its final name as part of the sport society Spartak. The bandy club was discontinued in 1961. For other departments of this club in Moscow, see Spartak Moscow.

During its active years, Spartak Moscow managed to win the bronze medal in the Soviet bandy championship in 1950, and 1951, and was finalist in the Soviet Cup in 1948. The club also won the Moscow district championship in 1927, 1928, 1942, 1947, 1960 and was the runner-up in 1929.

Sources
 Based on the Russian Wikipedia article, which in turn refers to Соснин В.И., Щеглов М.И., Юрин В.Л. Хоккей с мячом: Энциклопедия. — М: Новые технологии, 2009. — 808 с. — .

Bandy clubs in Russia
Bandy clubs in the Soviet Union
Bandy clubs established in 1910
Spartak Moscow